The Whale Sound  is a sound in the Avannaata municipality, NW Greenland.

Geography
It is a broad channel that runs roughly from east to west between the mouth of the Inglefield Fjord and Baffin Bay. Its minimum width is 19 km. 

The Whale Sound separates Steensby Land —part of the Greenland mainland— to the south from Kiatak (Northumberland Island) and Qeqertarsuaq (Herbert Island) to the north. The Murchison Sound leads from the Baffin Bay to the Inglefield Fjord on the north side of the islands.  the Olrik Fjord has its entrance at the eastern end of the sound.

References

External links 
Explanatory notes to the Geological map of Greenland

Sounds of North America
Straits of Greenland
Bodies of water of Baffin Bay